Villa de Vallecas (Village of Vallecas) is one of the 21 districts of the city of Madrid, Spain. It forms, with the district of Puente de Vallecas, the geographical area of Vallecas.

Geography

Subdivision
The district is administratively divided into 3 wards (Barrios):
Casco Histórico de Vallecas
Santa Eugenia
Ensanche de Vallecas

External links 

 
Districts of Madrid